The Spirit Awakened is a 1912 American short silent drama film directed by D. W. Griffith and starring Blanche Sweet.

Cast
 Blanche Sweet - The Young Woman
 W. Chrystie Miller - The Young Woman's Father
 Kate Bruce - The Young Woman's Mother
 Edward Dillon - The Christian Farmhand
 Alfred Paget - The Renegade Farmhand
 Mae Marsh - The Renegade Farmhand's Sweetheart
 J. Jiquel Lanoe (as Jacque Lenor)
 Charles West

See also
 D. W. Griffith filmography
 Blanche Sweet filmography

References

External links

1912 films
American silent short films
American black-and-white films
1912 drama films
1912 short films
Films directed by D. W. Griffith
Silent American drama films
1910s American films